The 1987 Refuge Assurance League was the nineteenth competing of what was generally known as the Sunday League.  The competition was won for the second time by Worcestershire County Cricket Club.

The Worcestershire team included stars such as Ian Botham, Graeme Hick and Graham Dilley. Two other Worcs players got the batting and bowling plaudits. Opener Tim Curtis scored the most runs and fast bowler Neal Radford took the most wickets in the competition.

Standings

Batting averages

Bowling averages

See also
Sunday League

References

Refuge
Pro40